During the Russian invasion of Ukraine, which began on 24 February 2022, the possibility of Russia using tactical nuclear weapons, and the risk of broader nuclear escalation, has been widely discussed by commentators and in the media. Several senior Russian politicians, including president Vladimir Putin, former president and party leader Dmitry Medvedev, and foreign minister Sergey Lavrov, have made a number of statements widely seen as threatening the use of nuclear weapons.

Additionally, the Russian occupation of the Zaporizhzhia Nuclear Power Plant has led to a crisis over the safety of the plant and the risk of a nuclear disaster.

Russian statements

Four days after the launch of the Russian invasion, on 28 February, President Putin ordered Russia's nuclear forces to go into a "special mode of combat duty", a state of high alert.

On 20 April 2022, Russia carried out its first test launch of the RS-28 Sarmat, a new long-range intercontinental ballistic missile (ICBM). Putin said the new missile could defeat any missile defences, and that it should cause countries threatening Russia to "think twice". The United States Department of Defense confirmed that Russia had properly notified the U.S. about the launch in advance, pursuant to New START, and that the U.S. considered the launch to be a test routine and not a threat.

On 24 April, in apparent response to US secretary of state Antony Blinken's meeting with Zelenskyy in Kyiv on 23 April, Russian foreign minister Sergey Lavrov stated that further support of Ukraine could cause tensions which could potentially lead to a World War III scenario involving Russia's full arsenal of weapons. The day after Lavrov's comments, CNBC reported that US secretary Lloyd Austin referred to Russia's nuclear war rhetoric as being "dangerous and unhelpful".

In apparent response to Germany deploying armed tanks to Ukraine, Putin announced in Russia's main legislative assembly that Russia would respond to any combative military provocation from outside of Ukraine with prompt peremptory action possible only with Russia's unique arsenal of nuclear weapons. Pentagon Press secretary John Kirby called Putin's assertion of nuclear potency contrary to the process of the peaceful resolution of the current conflict in Ukraine.

On 29 May, after repudiating accusations made against Russia regarding atrocities in Bucha, the Russian ambassador to the UK, Andrei Kelin, said in an interview with the BBC that he did not believe Russia would use tactical nuclear weapons in Ukraine until Russian sovereignty was found to be in peril.

On 21 September, while announcing a partial mobilization of conscripts, Putin said that Russia "will use all the means at our disposal" – widely interpreted as a threat to use nuclear weapons – in order to defend the country’s territory. He warned that his threat was "not a bluff", baselessly accused NATO of "nuclear blackmail" and of threatening to use nuclear weapons against Russia, and said Russia's nuclear weapons were more advanced than NATO's. Russian Foreign Minister Sergey Lavrov did not rule out the use of nuclear weapons to defend annexed Ukrainian territories. Several days later, former Russian president and Putin ally Dmitry Medvedev made a more explicit threat of a nuclear strike against Ukraine.

On 1 October, Ramzan Kadyrov, head of the Chechen Republic, called on Russia to use low-yield nuclear weapons in Ukraine in response to Russia losing the strategically important Ukrainian town of Lyman, the first prominent Russian official to directly call for the use of nuclear weapons. In response to Kadyrov's comments, Kremlin press secretary Dmitry Peskov said that the use of nuclear weapons would be determined by Russian military doctrine and not by emotions.

Later in October, Russian officials, including Russian defense minister Sergei Shoigu, began accusing Ukraine of preparing to use a radioactive dirty bomb on Ukrainian territory, prompting concerns in the West that Russia itself might be planning to use a dirty bomb and blame it on Ukraine. The allegations were additionally communicated in phone calls to Western officials by two top Russian officials. On 24 October, John Kirby stated that there was no evidence Russia was preparing a dirty bomb strike. A tweet by the Russian Ministry of Defence, purportedly showing evidence of a Ukrainian dirty bomb in production, was debunked as a collection of old and unrelated photos. At Ukraine's request, the United Nations sent an IAEA investigation to Ukraine, which found no evidence of a dirty bomb being developed or any other undeclared nuclear activity.

On 22 January 2023, Vyacheslav Volodin, the speaker of the Duma, wrote on Telegram that "If Washington and NATO countries supply weapons that will be used to strike civilian cities and attempt to seize our territories, as they threaten, this will lead to retaliatory measures using more powerful weapons," and "Arguments that the nuclear powers have not previously used weapons of mass destruction in local conflicts are untenable. Because these states did not face a situation where there was a threat to the security of their citizens and the territorial integrity of the country." In the same month, Russia repeatedly accused Ukraine of storing its military equipment in the nuclear power plants under its control. The IAEA has permanent observers in all Ukrainian plants since 2022, and on 24 January 2023, the agency issued a statement that it had found no military equipment in the plants.

On 21 February 2023, during the Presidential Address to the Federal Assembly, Putin announced that Russia would be suspending its participation in New START, the last remaining nuclear weapons treaty between Russia and the United States. He stated, "[Russia] is not withdrawing from the treaty but is suspending its participation."

On 26 February 2023, to Rossiya 1, a state-owned television channel, Putin said that Russia had no choice but to "take into account" the nuclear capabilities of NATO, and that the West wanted to "liquidate" Russia.

International reactions
On 14 April, The New York Times reported comments by CIA director William Burns, who said "potential desperation" could lead President Putin to order the use of tactical nuclear weapons.

On 4 May, the US Senate held the "Hearing on Nuclear Readiness Amid Russia-Ukraine War" where Admiral Charles A. Richard stated that current nuclear triad defence capabilities in the US were operating at a minimal acceptable level of operational capacity, with Russian stockpiles and Chinese stockpiles currently larger than those of the US. On 6 May, Russian foreign ministry spokesman Alexei Zaitsev stated that Russia would not use nuclear weapons in Ukraine, describing their use as "not applicable to the Russian 'special military operation'".

On 23 May, Russian diplomat Boris Bondarev resigned from his position and issued a critique of the invasion, singling out Lavrov's position on the potential use of Russian nuclear arms: "In 18 years, he (Lavrov) went from a professional and educated intellectual... to a person who constantly broadcasts conflicting statements and threatens the world with nuclear weapons!"  Japan's Prime Minister Fumio Kishida stated that Japan would support further international discussion about Russia and its nuclear arms threats during the invasion of Ukraine at the upcoming nuclear non-proliferation meeting taking place next August. On 20 June, the "Conference on the Humanitarian Impact of Nuclear Weapons" opened in Vienna to discuss potential catastrophic effects of nuclear arms, amid rising fears over Russia's possible use of nuclear weapons during the 2022 invasion of Ukraine.

On 1 July, during a visit by Lavrov to Belarus, Belarusian president Alexander Lukashenko indicated support for Moscow to use nuclear weapons against the broad threats of Western hegemony over Russia and its allies demonstrated during the conflict in Ukraine.

On 13 August, in an interview with the BBC, Jim Hockenhull, the outgoing head of UK Military Intelligence, said he considered the possibility of Russia imminently using nuclear weapons to be "unlikely".

In a September 2022 interview, U.S. President Joe Biden was asked what consequences would ensue for Russian use of nuclear weapons. Biden responded: "You think I would tell you if I knew exactly what it would be? Of course, I'm not gonna tell you. It'll be consequential...  They'll become more of a pariah in the world than they ever have been. And depending on the extent of what they do will determine what response would occur." On 26 September, national security advisor Jake Sullivan spoke of "catastrophic consequences" if Russia used nuclear weapons, adding that "in private channels we have spelled out in greater detail (to Russia) exactly what that would mean". Secretary of State Antony Blinken similarly referred to a "catastrophic" U.S. response.

NATO Secretary-General Jens Stoltenberg stated on 21 September that NATO would "not engage in that same kind of reckless and dangerous nuclear rhetoric as President Putin". On 4 October, British foreign minister James Cleverly said any Russian use of nuclear weapons would lead to consequences. Minister of Foreign Affairs of Poland Zbigniew Rau has stated a NATO response should be "devastating", but non-nuclear. Rau also stated on 5 October that he has asked for the U.S. to base nuclear weapons on Polish territory; this may have been partly in response to Russia's recent nuclear threat, and partly in response to the prospect of Russia basing nuclear weapons in Belarus.

On 6 October 2022, during a speech at a private fundraiser in New York City, Biden said that for the "[f]irst time since the Cuban Missile Crisis, we have a direct threat of the use of the nuclear weapon if, in fact, things continue down the path they've been going... Think about it: We have not faced the prospect of Armageddon since Kennedy and the Cuban Missile Crisis. We've got a guy I know fairly well; his name is Vladimir Putin. I spent a fair amount of time with him. He is not joking when he talks about the potential use of tactical and nuclear weapons, or biological or chemical weapons, because his military is, you might say, significantly underperforming... I don't think there’s any such thing as an ability to easily [use] a tactical nuclear weapon and not end up with Armageddon." According to the Associated Press, Biden sometimes speaks in an unguarded way, using only rough notes, at such private fundraisers; White House Press Secretary Karine Jean-Pierre later said that Biden's comments were not based on new intelligence or information. In an interview with CNN's Jake Tapper that aired on 11 October 2022, Biden said that he did not believe Putin would ultimately resort to deploying nuclear weapons in Ukraine, but criticized Putin's statements on the topic as "irresponsible".

In an interview with the BBC on 11 October 2022, GCHQ Director Jeremy Fleming said the agency had seen no indications that Russia was preparing for the use of a tactical nuclear weapon. Later, in a statement released on 18 October, Major General Kyrylo Budanov, Chief of the Main Directorate of Intelligence of Ukraine’s Ministry of Defense, said he did not believe Russia would use nuclear weapons in Ukraine.

On 24 January 2023, the Bulletin of the Atomic Scientists adjusted its Doomsday Clock to 90 seconds to midnight, a 10-second advancement from the Clock's previous time setting in 2020. The organization cited increasing risk of nuclear escalation stemming from Russia's invasion of Ukraine as a major factor in the adjustment.

During a press briefing at the White House on 25 January 2023, John Kirby, Coordinator for Strategic Communications for the United States National Security Council, said that the United States does not "have any indication that Mr. Putin has any intention to use weapons of mass destruction - let alone nuclear weapons, tactical or otherwise." Kirby also said the United States has seen "absolutely no indications that Mr. Putin has designs on striking NATO territory."

Analysis

Eric Schlosser, writing for The Atlantic magazine on 22 June 2022, stated that the nuclear saber-rattling by Russia during the invasion appeared to suggest the most probable targets of a nuclear attack to be: "(1) a detonation over the Black Sea, causing no casualties but demonstrating a resolve to cross the nuclear threshold and signaling that worse may come, (2) a decapitation strike against the Ukrainian leadership, attempting to kill President Volodymyr Zelensky and his advisers in their underground bunkers, (3) a nuclear assault on a Ukrainian military target, perhaps an air base or a supply depot, that is not intended to harm civilians, and (4) the destruction of a Ukrainian city, causing mass civilian casualties and creating terror to precipitate a swift surrender — the same aims that motivated the nuclear attacks on Hiroshima and Nagasaki." CSIS military expert Mark Cancian suggested the possibility of detonating high in the atmosphere to produce an electromagnetic pulse and knock out electronic equipment.

On 7 September, The Washington Post reported that the Russian high military command had published an analysis saying that tactical nuclear arms remained a viable option for use against Ukraine, quoting Ukrainian commander in chief Valeriy Zaluzhnyi as stating: "There is a direct threat of the use, under certain circumstances, of tactical nuclear weapons by the Russian Armed Forces... It is also impossible to completely rule out the possibility of the direct involvement of the world’s leading countries in a ‘limited’ nuclear conflict, in which the prospect of World War III is already directly visible."

Hans M. Kristensen, director of the Nuclear Information Project at the Federation of American Scientists, said that "if you start detonating nuclear weapons in the area you potentially get radioactive fallout that you can't control — it could rain over your own troops as well, so it might not be an advantage to do that in the field." He also said that "the big problem is with people both inside the Russian system, but also in the public in general, if they think about tactical nuclear weapons as something small; something less severe or something almost okay." On 1 October 2022, the Institute for the Study of War argued that Russian soldiers are "almost certainly incapable of operating on a nuclear battlefield", owing to their disorganization, and that this inability to advance through a nuclear environment reduces the likelihood of Russian tactical nuclear weapons use in the first place.

In a 2 October 2022 analysis, The Jerusalem Post stated "Most experts do not think that Russian President Vladimir Putin will actually use nuclear weapons in Ukraine at the end of the day, but the number of those who think he will or might is growing." Different analysts hypothesized different initial Western responses, depending in part on the nature of the initial Russian nuclear attack on Ukraine. Hypothetical initial responses included: increased sanctions, a conventional assault on Russian forces in Ukraine, a nuclear attack on Russian forces in Ukraine, or a nuclear attack on Belarus. Their analysis added that, even if Russia used a nuclear weapon, "the likelihood is still no" that it would lead to a full nuclear war. Mark Cancian has suggested increased weapons shipments, including previously-restricted weapons like NATO aircraft, advanced anti-missile batteries, and ATACMS long-range missiles.

In January 2023, Graham Allison, writing for Time, presented a seven-point summary of Putin's hypothetical intention to deploy tactical nuclear weapons in Ukraine. Allison stated that: (1) There is a "rational" basis for Putin to apply limited nuclear weapons based on the older historical precedent set by Truman in WWII against Japan; (2) Putin has evaluated the risks of American retaliation for the use of tactical nuclear weapons and America's response that it would cause "catastrophic consequences" for Russia, the same as it would have during the height of the Cold War; (3) The potential loss of face for Putin before the Russian people in the case that Zelenskyy is successful in repelling further Russian occupational gains might provide an incentive for Putin to expand his theater of warfare to include tactical nuclear weapons against Ukraine; (4) Putin does consider it politically justified to apply first-use of tactical nuclear weapons based on the standing Russian military doctrine called "escalate to de-escalate", in order to make adversarial forces stand-down; (5) Putin is aware of Biden's assertion that U.S. forces "will not fight World War III for Ukraine", even though Biden is aware of America's previous commitments to the military strategy of mutually assured destruction; (6) Reagan's doctrine that a "nuclear war cannot be won and must never be fought" is part of America's political legacy as well, which appears relevant to Biden's perspective of which Putin is aware; and (7) Putin is also aware of the Cold War doctrine developed in previous generations that Soviet adversaries would be met with "determined effort" by U.S. military forces in case of Soviet military belligerence while conducting military operations.

Zaporizhzhia Nuclear Plant crisis

See also

Atomic bombings of Hiroshima and Nagasaki
Cuban Missile Crisis
Disinformation in the 2022 Russian invasion of Ukraine
Russia and weapons of mass destruction
Media portrayal of the Russo-Ukrainian War
Nuclear terrorism
Nuclear warfare
Mutual assured destruction
Global catastrophe scenarios
World War III

References

Nuclear weapons and the 2022 Russian invasion of Ukraine
Russo-Ukrainian War
2022 in international relations
Nuclear weapons of Russia
Nuclear safety and security
Nuclear terrorism